Bismarckburg is a placename formerly applied to locations in Germany's African colonies. It may refer to

 Bismarckburg, Togo
 Bismarckburg, German East Africa, now Kasanga, Tanzania